Daniel C. Sullivan (May 9, 1857 – October 26, 1893), nicknamed "Link", was a professional baseball player who was a catcher in the Major Leagues from -. He played for the St. Louis Browns, Pittsburgh Alleghenys, and Louisville Eclipse.  He caught the sixth and seventh no-hitters in baseball history (by Tony Mullane and Guy Hecker, respectively) eight days apart on September 11 and 19, 1882.

External links

1857 births
1893 deaths
Major League Baseball catchers
St. Louis Browns (AA) players
Pittsburgh Alleghenys players
Louisville Eclipse players
Louisville Colonels players
19th-century baseball players
New York Metropolitans (minor league) players
Savannah (minor league baseball) players
Baseball players from Providence, Rhode Island
Marquette Undertakers players